Daniel Mullen (born 1 March 1995) is a Scottish professional footballer who plays as a striker for Scottish Championship side Partick Thistle. He has previously played for Livingston, St Mirren and Dundee.

Career

Livingston
Mullen signed for Livingston at youth level in 2012 after being released by Aberdeen. After progressing through the youth ranks at Livingston, Mullen made his debut for the first-team on 18 August 2012 against Airdrie United as a second-half substitute at the age of 17. He scored his first goal for the club on 8 December 2012 in a 2–1 win over Dunfermline Athletic. In total, he made 24 appearances in all competitions in his first season at the club, with most coming as a substitute.

St Mirren
With Mullen's contract at Livingston due to expire in 2018, Mullen moved to St Mirren in December 2017. He initially moved on an "emergency loan" basis, with a five-figure transfer fee due to be paid for the permanent transfer in January. On 11 January 2018 it was confirmed that Mullen had signed a -year permanent deal with Saints, tying him to the club until the summer of 2020. In June 2020, Mullen left Saints when his contract expired.

Dundee
On 4 August 2020, Mullen signed for Dundee, on a two-year deal. Mullen scored his first goal for the club in his debut in a 0–2 win over Brora Rangers in the League Cup.

Mullen would play a major role for Dundee in the Premiersip play-offs final, including scoring a key goal against Kilmarnock to help bring Dundee back to the Premiership.

In the opening game of the season, Mullen suffered a serious ankle injury which required surgery and was expected to keep him out for around 3 months. He recovered earlier than expected and made his return in a home win against Aberdeen. Mullen found his shooting boots after returning, scoring in three consecutive games to help turn the club's form. Mullen left Dundee following the end of his contract in May 2022.

Partick Thistle 
On 21 July 2022, Mullen signed a one-year deal with Scottish Championship side Partick Thistle. He scored on his debut for the Jags in a Scottish League Cup group stage win over Montrose.

Career statistics

Honours 
Livingston

 Scottish Challenge Cup: 2014–15
St Mirren
 Scottish Championship: 2017–18

References

External links
 

1995 births
Living people
Association football forwards
Scottish Football League players
Scottish footballers
Livingston F.C. players
Scottish Professional Football League players
St Mirren F.C. players
Partick Thistle F.C. players